Roy Dundonald Cochrane (13 February 1892 – 5 December 1968) was an English cricketer.  Cochrane's batting and bowling styles are unknown.  He was born at Kensington, London and educated at Marlborough College.

Cochrane made a single first-class appearance for Sussex against Cambridge University at Fenner's, Cambridge in 1913.  In Sussex's first-innings he was dismissed for 6 runs by Henry Mulholland.  He took the wickets of John Naumann and Samuel McCaughey, finishing with figures of 2/37 from seven overs.  He wasn't required to bat in Sussex's second-innings, as they won the match by 5 wickets.  This was his only major appearance for Sussex.

He died at Kensington, London on 5 December 1968.

References

External links
Roy Cochrane at ESPNcricinfo
Roy Cochrane at CricketArchive

1892 births
1968 deaths
Sportspeople from Kensington
People educated at Marlborough College
English cricketers
Sussex cricketers